Kakhkuk (also Romanized as Kākhkūk; also known as Kākhūk, Kākhk, and Kuhkuk) is a village in Jolgeh-e Mazhan Rural District, Jolgeh-e Mazhan District, Khusf County, South Khorasan Province, Iran. At the 2006 census, its population was 12, in 4 families.

References 

Populated places in Khusf County